A DJ or disc jockey is a person who plays recorded music for an audience.

DJ may also refer to:

Businesses
 Dow Jones Industrial Average, a stock market index
 Dansk Jernbane, a Danish freight company
 David Jones Limited, an Australian retailer
 Virgin Blue (IATA code DJ), Australia-based airline prior to rebranding as Virgin Australia
 Disney Junior

In arts and entertainment

Fictional characters
 DJ (comics), a Marvel character
 DJ Conner, a Roseanne character
 D.J. Tanner, a Full House character
 Dee Jay, a Street Fighter character
 D.J., on the TV series The O.C.
 DJ, a Rang De Basanti character
 DJ (Transformers), one of the Jointron Brothers
 Dee-Jay (G.I. Joe), a Battleforce 2000 character in the G.I. Joe universe
 DJ (Star Wars), character from the 2017 Star Wars film The Last Jedi, played by actor Benicio Del Toro
 DJ, a character in the Total Drama series
 DJay, the protagonist in the film Hustle & Flow

Music
 "DJ" (Alphabeat song), 2009
 "DJ" (David Bowie song), 1979
 "DJ" (H & Claire song), 2002
 "DJ" (Jamelia song), 2004
 "DJ" (Marianta Pieridi song), 2006
 D'Jais, D'Jais Bar & Grill, a popular dance club and restaurant in Belmar, New Jersey, USA
 Deejay (Jamaican), a type of reggae or dancehall rapper
 Dell Digital Jukebox, a digital audio player
 "DJ", a song by Amanda Blank on the album I Love You
 "DJ Song", a song by Miss Kittin & The Hacker from First Album
 "DJ"; a song by Sunidhi Chauhan ft. Ali Zafar, for the 2015 film Hey Bro

In other media
 DJ Magazine, a British monthly magazine
 Disc Jockey, a 1951 film starring Ginny Simms, Tom Drake, George Shearing and Sarah Vaughan
 DJ: Duvvada Jagannadham, a 2017 Indian Telugu-language film

In language
 Đ (D with stroke), a letter in several alphabets
 đ, a representation of the digraph ⟨dj⟩ in some versions of Gaj's Latin alphabet

People
DJ Ashba (born 1972), American musician, producer, and songwriter 
D. J. Augustin (born 1987), American basketball player 
D. J. Carey (born 1970), Irish hurler
D. J. Cooper (born 1990), American basketball player in the Israeli Basketball Premier League
DJ Dale (born 2000), American football player
DJ Delorie, software developer
DJ LeMahieu (born 1988), American baseball player
D.J. Peterson (1959–1993), former American professional wrestler
D. J. Peterson (baseball) (born 1991), American baseball player
DJ Pryor, American stand-up comedian and actor
DJ Qualls (born 1978), American actor
D. J. Seeley (born 1989), American basketball player
D. J. Turner (born 1997), American football player
DJ Uiagalelei (born 2001), American football player
D. J. Woods (born 1989), American football player
Daniel Padilla (born 1995), Filipino actor and singer
Demetrious Johnson (fighter) (born 1986), American MMA fighter
Dennis Johnson (1954–2007), American basketball player
Dustin Johnson (born 1984), American golfer

Places
 Djibouti, ISO 3166-1 country code
 .dj, a top-level domain for Djibouti
 Dolj County, Romania, abbreviated DJ on car number plates

In science and technology
 Decijoule, a measurement of energy
 Deterministic jitter, a telecommunications term
 Jeep DJ, a two-wheel-drive variant of the CJ series

Other uses
 Deutsches Jungvolk, the junior section of the Hitler Youth for boys from 10 to 14 years old
 Dinner jacket, a suit also known as a tuxedo
 DJ Mag 100, an annual ranking poll for DJs by DJ Magazine
 Dust jacket, the detachable outer cover of a book, with folded flaps

See also
 Deejay (disambiguation)
 Djay (disambiguation)
 DJ & the Fro, an animated series that aired on MTV